Aethes eichleri is a species of moth of the family Tortricidae. It was described by Razowski in  1983. It is found in Bulgaria and Iran.

Adults are on wing from May to July.

The larvae feed on Eryngium campestre, Daucus carota, Pastinaca, Peucedanum, Angelica sylvestris, Elaeoselinum meoides, Crithmum maritimum, Astydamia canarensis and Ferula communis.

References

eichleri
Moths described in 1983
Taxa named by Józef Razowski
Moths of Europe
Moths of Asia